It's a Beautiful Day is an American band formed in San Francisco, California, in 1967, featuring vocalist Pattie Santos along with violinist David LaFlamme and his wife, Linda LaFlamme, on keyboards.

David LaFlamme, who as a youth had once performed as a soloist with the Utah Symphony Orchestra, had previously been in the group Orkustra playing five-string violin. The other members of It's a Beautiful Day in its early years were Val Fuentes (drums), Mitchell Holman (bass) and Hal Wagenet (guitar). Although they were one of the notable San Francisco bands to emerge from 1967's Summer of Love, the band never achieved the success of contemporaries such as the Grateful Dead, Jefferson Airplane, and Santana, with whom they had connections. The band created a unique blend of rock, jazz, folk, classical, and world-beat styles.

Early history: 1967–1969
The band's original manager, Matthew Katz, had previously worked with the rock bands Jefferson Airplane and Moby Grape. The members of the band were unaware that the other two bands were already trying to end their business relationships with Katz. During 1967 and early 1968, Katz prevented It's a Beautiful Day from performing in San Francisco, telling them they were not ready. He booked their first public appearances at a club he controlled in Seattle, Washington, formerly known as the Encore Ballroom. Katz renamed the club San Francisco Sound. While in Seattle, the group lived in the attic of an old house owned by Katz while writing and rehearsing new songs in between club performances. Few customers came to the club during the band's engagement in Seattle during December 1967.

The band's signature song "White Bird" was inspired by the experiences David and Linda LaFlamme had while living in Seattle. The song was partly inspired by Seattle's rainy winter weather. In a later interview, David LaFlamme said:

Where the 'white bird' thing came from ... We were like caged birds in that attic. We had no money, no transportation, the weather was miserable. We were just barely getting by on a very small food allowance provided to us. It was quite an experience, but it was very creative in a way.

By the time the group members returned to San Francisco they had no money and were frustrated by Katz's attempts to manipulate their career. In desperation, they began playing at a few clubs without his approval. The band gradually began to gain some recognition and earn money. Some of that recognition came from their performance at the Sky River Rock Festival and Lighter Than Air Fair, occurring over the 1968 Labor Day weekend in Sultan, Washington. Sky River is considered by many to be the first successful multi-day rock festival, and a number of major bands had the opportunity to hear It's a Beautiful Day there. The band got its first big break when offered a chance to open for Cream at the Oakland Coliseum, in Oakland, California on October 4, 1968. Around this time, the band first began a long process of trying to disentangle themselves from Katz.

The band's debut album, It's a Beautiful Day, was produced by David LaFlamme in Los Angeles, California, and released by Columbia Records in 1969. It features tracks such as "White Bird", "Hot Summer Day", and "Time Is".  The album reached number 47 in the U.S. charts and number 58 in the UK. The theme from the song "Bombay Calling" was later used, at a slower tempo, by Deep Purple as the intro to "Child in Time" on its Deep Purple in Rock album. The band retaliated by recording "Don & Dewey" which was, to all intents and purposes, identical to Deep Purple's "Wring That Neck". The vocals and violin playing of David LaFlamme plus Santos's singing attracted FM radio play attention, and nationally, "White Bird" bubbled under Billboard's Hot 100 chart, peaking at number 118.

1970s and beyond
By 1970, the original lineup of the band had changed; the LaFlammes had split up and Linda left the band, replaced by Fred Webb. On July 5, 1970, the band played the second Atlanta International Pop Festival in Byron, Georgia to an estimated 250,000 people. The group's second album, Marrying Maiden, recorded at Pacific High Recording Studios in San Francisco, was released in 1970. It was their most successful on the charts, reaching number 28 in the U.S. and number 45 in the U.K. In that same year, the band performed at the Holland Pop Festival at the Kralingse Bos in Rotterdam, Netherlands, and at the Bath Festival of Blues and Progressive Music.

It's a Beautiful Day was one of the last acts to appear at the Fillmore West in San Francisco in July 1971.  Its performance of "White Bird" was featured as part of the musical documentary film Fillmore, released the following year.
Mitchell Holman and Hal Wagenet left in the summer of 1971, replaced by bassist Tom Fowler (later with Frank Zappa) and guitarist Bill Gregory. Their first performance was broadcast live on San Francisco's KSAN FM radio, with host Tom Donahue introducing them as the band's two new members.

The group released their third album, Choice Quality Stuff/Anytime, in 1971, followed by the live album, It's a Beautiful Day at Carnegie Hall, in 1972. Tom Fowler left that same year. Citing exhaustion, and with differences arising over the direction and management of the band amongst band members, David LaFlamme resigned later in 1972. It's A Beautiful Day...Today was recorded and released the following year, the band touring until the summer of 1973 when it split up. Replacement bassist and vocalist James "Bud" Cockrell would help form Pablo Cruise shortly thereafter, and violinist Gregory Bloch joined the Italian progressive rock group Premiata Forneria Marconi and later the Saturday Night Live Band.

In 1976, LaFlamme's solo version of "White Bird" finally cracked the Billboard Hot 100, peaking at No. 89. Pattie Santos, who together with her husband, former group bassist Bud Cockrell, had formed Cockrell & Santos in 1977, was killed in a car crash near Geyserville in Sonoma County, California on December 14, 1989. Cockrell himself died in 2010.

It's a Beautiful Day reformed occasionally for reunions and special concerts. The band's music continued under the name David LaFlamme Band as well as It's a Beautiful Day until Katz let his trademark of the name go unrenewed, when the use of It's a Beautiful Day was formally resumed.

Since 2000, It's a Beautiful Day features founder David LaFlamme and original drummer Fuentes. Other band members are LaFlamme's current wife, whom he met in 1974, Linda Baker LaFlamme (vocals), Toby Gray (bass), Gary Thomas (keyboards), Rob Espinosa (guitar) and Michael Prichard (percussion).  They continue performing today, with LaFlamme contributing to Jefferson Starship's 2008 release, Jefferson's Tree of Liberty. This line-up was the longest continual group that has ever performed the band's material.  In 2014, Rob Cunningham replaced Espinosa on lead guitar. Rob Espinosa returned as lead guitar in 2018  

In 2009 David LaFlamme began playing with the Phil Lawrence Band and transformed the group into It's A Beautiful Day Acoustic.  The band played acoustic versions of the best-known originals from the early albums, plus instrumental originals by Phil Lawrence on the mandolin. They performed until the pandemic shutdown in March 2020.

Personnel
Current members
 David LaFlamme vocals, violin, rhythm guitar (1967–1972, 1997–present)
 Linda Baker LaFlamme (aka Dominique Dellacroix) vocals, backing vocals (1997–present)
 Val Fuentes drums, backing vocals (1967–1973, 1997–present)
 Toby Gray bass, harmonica, backing vocals (2000––present)
 Gary Thomas keyboards, backing vocals (2000–present)
 Rob Espinosa guitars, backing vocals (2000-present)
 Michael Prichard percussion (2006–present)

Former members
 Pattie Santos vocals, backing vocals, percussion (1967–1973; died 1989)
 Linda LaFlamme keyboards (1967–1969)
 Mitchell Holman bass, harmonica, backing vocals (1967–1971, plus several reunions)
 Hal Wagenet guitar (1968–1971, plus several reunions)
 Fred Webb keyboards, backing vocals (1969–1973; died 1989)
 Tom Fowler bass (1971–1972)
 Bill Gregory guitar (1971–1973)
 Bud Cockrell bass, vocals (1972–1973; died 2010)
 Greg Bloch violin, mandolin (1972–1973; died 1989)
 Rob Cunningham guitar, backing vocals (2014–2018)

Timeline

Discography

Albums

Studio albums
It's a Beautiful Day (Columbia Records, 1969) US Album Chart No. 47 / UK Album Chart No. 58, 1970 (US: Gold)
Marrying Maiden (Columbia Records, 1970) US Album Chart No. 28 / UK Album Chart No. 45, 1970
Choice Quality Stuff/Anytime (Columbia Records, 1971) US Album Chart No. 130, 1971 
It's a Beautiful Day... Today (Columbia Records, 1973) US Album Chart No. 114

Other albums
It's a Beautiful Day at Carnegie Hall (Live) (Columbia Records, 1972) US Album Chart No. 144
1001 Nights (Compilation) (Columbia Records (Import Only), 1974)
White Bird (David LaFlamme) (Amherst Records, 1976)
Inside Out (David LaFlamme) (Amherst Records, 1978)
Workin' the Gold Mine (Live) (David & Linda LaFlamme) (It's About Music, Classic Music Vault, 2000)
Beyond Dreams (David LaFlamme) (Repertoire Records, Classic Music Vault, 2003)
Hot Summer Days - San Francisco Nights (David LaFlamme) (Non-labeled, 2004)
Live in Seattle (Live) (David LaFlamme) (It's About Music, 2004)
Misery Loves Company (David LaFlamme) (It's About Music, 2005)
The Columbia Years 1969-1973 (Compilation Box Set) (Muskrat Records, 2008)
Girl With No Eyes (Hookah Records, 2013)
Live at the Fillmore '68 (Live) (Classic Music Vault, 2013), with DVD The David LaFlamme Story

Singles
"Bulgaria" / "Aquarian Dream" (1968) San Francisco Sound 7
"White Bird" / "Wasted Union Blues" (1969) Columbia 44928
"Soapstone Mountain" / "Good Lovin'" (1970) Columbia 45152
"The Dolphins" / "Do You Remember the Sun" (1970) Columbia 45309
"Anytime" / "Oranges and Apples" (1972) Columbia 45536
"White Bird" (live) / "Wasted Union Blues" (live) (1973) Columbia 45788
"Ain't That Lovin' You Baby" / "Time" (1973) Columbia 45853

See also

 List of bands from the San Francisco Bay Area

References

External links
 David LaFlamme Presents the Music of It's a Beautiful Day
 [ Allmusic.com]
 
 

1967 establishments in California
Musical groups from San Francisco
Musical groups established in 1967
Psychedelic rock music groups from California
Columbia Records artists